Robert O'Reilly (born March 25, 1950) is an American film, stage, and television actor who has appeared in a variety of roles. He appeared in the Star Trek franchise for over ten years, primarily in his recurring role on Star Trek: The Next Generation and Star Trek: Deep Space Nine as Chancellor Gowron, the leader of the Klingon Empire. He has also appeared in over 100 films and television episodes, and has acted on Broadway and at Carnegie Hall. His links with the Colony Theatre Company resulted in his receiving a Drama-Logue Award in 1981 for directing the play Getting Out.

Career
O'Reilly has appeared in over a hundred films and television episodes, primarily as either the antagonist or as a villain. The television series he has appeared in include Cheers, Darkroom, Knight Rider, Sledge Hammer!, MacGyver, In the Heat of the Night, NYPD Blue, and twice in Dallas. His film appearances include the Jim Carrey film The Mask. He has retired from acting.

Star Trek
O'Reilly made his first appearance in the Star Trek franchise with an appearance in the Star Trek: The Next Generation episode "Manhunt". The character he played in that episode has been referred to both as "Tough guy" and "Scarface". He was then cast as the Klingon Gowron in the episode "Reunion" which saw the character become the new Chancellor of the Klingon Empire. O'Reilly had just finished appearing on stage as Edmund in King Lear and saw similarities between the two characters which resulted in him basing Gowron upon the Shakespearian character. The episode was directed by TNG cast member Jonathan Frakes, and O'Reilly later said that he thought he was hired both for the sense of curiosity he brought to the role and a piercing, unsettling gaze he and others referred to as "that crazy loon eyeball thing".

He went on to appear as Gowron over the course of the next decade in several further episodes of The Next Generation, as well as Star Trek: Deep Space Nine. He also filmed segments for the video game Star Trek: Klingon, which was also directed by Frakes. The game was the first Star Trek game to use real actors, and was awarded the Sci-Fi Universe Reader's Choice Universe Award for Best Achievement in Genre Multi-Media. At the time of filming the game, he had heard a rumour that Michael Dorn was joining the cast of Deep Space Nine. Given the relationship between Gowron and Dorn's character, Worf, O'Reilly thought that this might lead to his return to a Star Trek television series too. Both Dorn and O'Reilly reprised their characters together in the series four opening episode "The Way of the Warrior". O'Reilly also appeared as a different Klingon in the Star Trek: The Next Generation Interactive VCR Board Game, a video cassette-based board game. His likeness was used for three action figures, a life-size poster and several lithographs.

After the end of Deep Space Nine, O'Reilly made one further appearance in Star Trek as the character Kago-Darr in the Star Trek: Enterprise episode "Bounty". He was thankful for the role, as he felt that the writers and producers of the show had created it for him specifically as his family was trying to adapt following the birth of his triplets. After his retirement from acting, he continues to attend Star Trek conventions, including performing in character as Gowron alongside J. G. Hertzler as fellow Klingon Martok. In 2020, he reprised the voice of Gowron and the Klingon Aakar, an ancestor of Gowron's, in the video game Star Trek Online.

Theatre
O'Reilly has appeared on Broadway in the revival of The Tavern, and also appeared off-Broadway in The Promise and at Carnegie Hall in / by Nam June Paik. He is currently associated with the Colony Theatre Company as an actor and director. He first became involved with the theatre company about a year after its founding. Amongst these was Getting Out by Marsha Norman, for which he was awarded a Drama-Logue Award and nominated for an award by the Los Angeles Drama Critics' Circle in 1981. He directed Generations by Dennis Clontz, which was runner up to the American Theatre Critics’ Association award for best new play outside of New York.

Personal life
O'Reilly's wife Judy gave birth to triplet sons Jack, Michael and Joseph in 1997. The family reside in Burbank, California. O'Reilly's hobbies include golf and baseball.

References

Notes

Bibliography

External links
 
 

1950 births
Male actors from New York City
American male film actors
American male stage actors
American male television actors
Living people